The 22nd Annual D.I.C.E. Awards is the 22nd edition of the D.I.C.E. Awards, an annual awards event that honors the best games in the video game industry. It was also held as part of the academy's 2019 D.I.C.E. Summit, and was co-hosted by Jessica Chobot of Nerdist News, and Kinda Funny co-founder Greg Miller.

God of War received the most nominations and won the most awards including Game of the Year. Sony Interactive Entertainment published the most nominated and award-winning games, with their Santa Monica Studio being the most nominated and award-winning developer.

Bonnie Ross, co-founder and head of 343 Industries, received the Hall of Fame Award.

Winners and Nominees
Winners are listed first, highlighted in boldface, and indicated with a double dagger.

Special Awards

Hall of Fame
 Bonnie Ross

Games with multiple nominations and awards

The following 20 games received multiple nominations:

The following two games received multiple awards:

Companies with multiple nominations

Companies that received multiple nominations as either a developer or a publisher.

Companies that received multiple awards as either a developer or a publisher.

External links

References

2019 awards
2019 awards in the United States
February 2019 events in the United States
2018 in video gaming
D.I.C.E. Award ceremonies